The Chicago and Northern District Association of Colored Women's Clubs (CNDA) was a woman's club formed in 1906 under the name the City Federation of Colored Women's Clubs (CFCWC). Its member clubs belonged to the Illinois Federation of Colored Women's Clubs (IFCWC).  Mrs. Cordelia West contacted women's club presidents in Chicago to join together to work more effectively to solve the problems facing the African-American community. Its motto was "From Possibilities to Realities" and Cordelia West served as the first president .

The original clubs were:

In 1921, during the presidency of Irene Gaines the City Federation of Colored Women's Clubs was incorporated under the name the Chicago and Northern District Association of Colored Women's Clubs. Sadie L. Adams was elected in that year as the president and served until 1933. Along with the new name came increased membership, establishment of a club house, and the creation of a home for dependent children.

Presidents of the CFCWC include Annie Peyton, Fannie Turner, Therese G. Macon, Clara Johnson, Jessie Johnson, and Martha Walton. The club celebrated its golden jubilee in 1956 and its diamond jubilee in 1981.

Further reading
The Story of Seventy-five Years of the Chicago and Northern District Association of Club Women, Inc., 1906-1981 was first published in 1956, then reprinted in 1981.
Toward a Tenderer Humanity and a Nobler Womanhood: African American Women's Clubs in Turn-Of-The-Century Chicago

References

African-American history of Illinois
African-American women's organizations
National Association of Colored Women's Clubs
Women's clubs in the United States
Women's organizations based in the United States
History of women in Illinois